Events from the year 1618 in France

Incumbents
 Monarch – Louis XIII

Events
Catherine de Vivonne, marquise de Rambouillet, begins remodelling the Paris residence which becomes the Hôtel de Rambouillet to form a literary salon.

Births
 
 January 8 – Madeleine Béjart, actress and theatre director (d. 1672)

Full date missing
Roger de Rabutin, Comte de Bussy, memoirist (died 1693)
François Blondel, architect (died 1686)
Lambert Closse, merchant (died 1662)
Médard des Groseilliers, explorer and fur trader (died 1696)
Simon Arnauld, Marquis de Pomponne, diplomat and minister (died 1699)

Deaths

Full date missing
Jacques Davy Duperron, cardinal (born 1556)
François de Boivin, chronicler

See also

References

1610s in France